Stop the Wedding is a 2016 American-Canadian made for television romantic comedy film directed by Anne Wheeler and starring Rachel Boston, Niall Matter, Alan Thicke and Lini Evans. It is an adaptation of the novel of the same name by Stephanie Bond. The film was produced by the Hallmark Channel  and premiered on their network in the United States on June 11, 2016, as part of their June wedding series. The film earned Anne Wheeler a 2017 Leo Award, in the Best Direction (Television Film) category.

Plot
Career orientated Anna Colton learns that her Aunt Belle has agreed to marry a multiple divorcee, suave actor Sean Castleberry, following a whirlwind romance. Anna is determined to stop the wedding from proceeding. Joining in her effort is Sean's handsome son, successful surgeon Dr. Clay Castleberry, and the pair work to prevent the nuptials, despite their mutual dislike of one another. Frustrated by their young relatives' efforts, Belle and Sean elope to Las Vegas in order to go through with their wedding. Regretting their previous obstructiveness, Anna and Clay rush to join their family members in order to celebrate their wedding, developing their own romantic feelings for one another along the way. However, a misunderstanding leads to Clay abandoning plans to attend the wedding and returns home, leaving Anna to desperately try to resolve their problems, reunite with Clay, and attend the wedding in support of her aunt.

Cast 
 Rachel Boston as Anna Colton
 Niall Matter as Clay Castleberry
 Alan Thicke as Sean Castleberry
 Lini Evans as Belle Colton
 Teryl Rothery as Suzie
 David Lewis as Jake
 Brenda Crichlow as Renee

Development

Adaptation
Bond first wrote her novel "Stop the Wedding" in 1998, but it was repeatedly turned down by her publisher. In 2012 she made the decision to self-publish the book, and it became a best seller. The book was picked up by an independent film producer, leading to Hallmark optioning it in 2014. The production marked the first time Hallmark adapted an independently published novel into a film.

Differences from the novel
In the novel the character of Belle Colton is the mother of Anna, whereas in the film, she is her maternal aunt.

Filming
Filming took place in March and April 2016, in Vancouver, British Columbia.

Broadcast
The film premiered on the Hallmark Channel of June 11, 2016, as part of the June Weddings Series.

Awards

References

External links

2016 television films
2016 films
2016 romantic comedy films
Hallmark Channel original films
English-language Canadian films
Canadian comedy television films
American comedy television films
Films shot in British Columbia
Films about weddings
Films based on American novels
Films based on romance novels
American romantic comedy films
Canadian romantic comedy films
2010s Canadian films
2010s American films